Aprosmictus is a genus of parrots in the family Psittaculidae native to Oceania. Several former members, including the Australian king parrot, are now placed in the genus Alisterus.

Taxonomy
The genus Aprosmictus was introduced in 1842 by the English ornithologist John Gould. The type species was designated as the red-winged parrot by George Gray in 1846. The name is from the Ancient Greek απροσμικτος/aprosmiktos which means "unsociable" or "solitary".

The genus contains two species:
 Jonquil parrot (Aprosmictus jonquillaceus)
 Red-winged parrot (Aprosmictus erythropterus)

References

 
Bird genera
Taxonomy articles created by Polbot